The Sangkar white-eye (Zosterops melanurus) is a bird species in the family Zosteropidae. It is also known as the Sunda white-eye. It is found on the Indonesian islands of Java and Bali.

This species was formerly treated as a subspecies of the Indian white-eye (previously the Oriental white-eye, Zosterops palpebrosus) but based on the results of a molecular phylogenetic study published in 2018, it was promoted to species rank. In western Java its range overlaps with the Indian white-eye subspecies buxtoni, which is a recent colonist from Sumatra. The two species interbreed where they co-occur. 

The Sangkar white-eye is similar in plumage to the Indian white-eye, but differs in having much yellower plumage, particularly the underparts which are entirely yellow instead of grey. It forages for insects, and favours the introduced Sesbania grandiflora when hunting. The breeding season for the Sangkar white-eye is from January to October, with a peak in May and June.

It is considered threatened as it is the most heavily traded wild bird in the world.

References

Sangkar white-eye
Birds of Java
Birds of Bali
Sangkar white-eye